SS Bigwin is a small steamship ferry that plies the waters of Lake of Bays in Muskoka area of Ontario.

History
The ship was built by Polson Iron Works of Toronto as a private boat for an American owner James Kuhn in 1910 as a yacht and named for his wife as Ella Mary. It was later sold to several owners (1924, 1945 and 1960) to serve as a ferry boat and renamed Bigwin after Bigwin Inn and Chief John Bigwin. In her last years of service, she shuttled customers to Bigwin Inn until it was abandoned and submerged in a slip next to Bigwin Inn from 1970s to 1991.

Recovery and restoration
After interested parties took notice of the ship, it was finally raised from the waters in 1991, and was stored on land for a few years until restoration began in 2002 and completed in 2013.

As cruise ship
Once restored to service, Bigwin provides cruises near Dorset, Ontario during a July and August sailing period (restricted due to navigation laws).

See also
 , a larger steamship that operates in the Muskoka region.

References
Notes

Sources
 

Steamships of Ontario
Ferries of Ontario
1910 ships
Transport in the District Municipality of Muskoka
Ships built in Ontario